The Cynwyd Heritage Trail is a 1.8-mile rail trail in Lower Merion, Pennsylvania, on Philadelphia's Main Line. The trail surface is partially asphalt and crushed stone. 

It follows the former SEPTA Cynwyd Line railway line from Cynwyd station to Belmont Avenue, with a branch to Philadelphia's Manyunk neighborhood via the Manayunk Bridge over the Schuylkill River. The bridge, also a rail-to-trail conversion, reopened in October 2015 after a renovation. The first pedestrian/cyclist-only bridge over the river, it connects to Schuylkill River Trail on the Philadelphia side.

Volunteers had for years maintained a trail along the former railroad right-of-way. In 2008, the Friends of the Cynwyd Heritage Trail organized as a volunteer group that recruits and organizes volunteer maintainers and raises funds to sustain and improve the park with permanent improvements and new amenities.

Construction on the Cynwyd Heritage Trail began in March 2011. A formal groundbreaking ceremony was held on May 5, 2011, and the trail was officially opened that summer.

References

External links

  of Friends of the Cynwyd Heritage Trail
Cynwyd Heritage Trail page on Lower Merion Township's municipal site

Rail trails in Pennsylvania
Heritage trails